In physics, the Newtonian limit is a mathematical approximation applicable to physical systems exhibiting (1) weak gravitation, (2) objects moving slowly compared to the speed of light, and (3) slowly changing (or completely static) gravitational fields.  Under these conditions, Newton's law of universal gravitation may be used to obtain values that are accurate. In general, and in the presence of significant gravitation, the general theory of relativity must be used.

In the Newtonian limit, spacetime is approximately flat and the Minkowski metric may be used over finite distances.  In this case 'approximately flat' is defined as space in which gravitational effect approaches 0, mathematically actual spacetime and Minkowski space are not identical, Minkowski space is an idealized model.

Special relativity
In special relativity, Newtonian behaviour can in most cases be obtained by performing the limit . In this limit, the often appearing gamma factor becomes 1

and the Lorentz transformations between reference frames turn into Galileo transformations

General relativity
The geodesic equation for a free particle on curved spacetime with metric  can be derived from the action

If the spacetime-metric is

then, ignoring all contributions of order  the action becomes 

which is the action that reproduces the Newtonian equations of motion of a particle in a gravitational potential

See also
Classical limit

References 

Special relativity
Dynamical systems